This is a list of Macedonian football transfers in the winter transfer window 2014–15 by club. Only transfers in Prva Liga are included.

Prva Liga

Vardar

In: 

Out:

Rabotnički

In: 

Out:

Shkëndija

In:

Out:

Sileks

In: 

Out:

Metalurg Skopje

In: 

Out:

Renova

In: 

Out:

Turnovo

In: 

Out:

Pelister

In: 

Out:

Bregalnica

In: 

Out:

Teteks

In: 

Out:

See also
 2014–15 Macedonian First Football League

References

External links
 MacedonianFootball.com 
 Football Federation of Macedonia 

Macedonian
Lists of North Macedonia football transfers